Paul Puopolo (born 2 December 1987) is a former Australian rules footballer who played for the Hawthorn Football Club in the Australian Football League (AFL). A man small in stature, he is known to jump into packs and take marks against much taller opponents. He is a 3-time premiership player having played in Hawthorn's back-to-back-to-back Grand Final triumphs in 2013, 2014 and 2015.

Norwood
Puopolo made his debut for Norwood in 2007 and started out as a small forward/midfielder. Puopolo, who hails from Hope Valley, South Australia quickly built a reputation as the South Australian National Football League's best lockdown small defender. He was converted into a defender by former Norwood coach Trevor Hill in 2008. Despite his lack of height, he has always had the strength and speed to counter his rivals. In 2008 he was a SANFL Coca-Cola Star Search Award Nominee. By the time he got drafted by Hawthorn at the end of 2010 he had played 68 senior games and kicked 13 goals for the Redlegs.

Hawthorn (2011–2020)
Puopolo made his debut for the Hawks in round 7 of the 2011 AFL season against Port Adelaide. At his debut he was the AFL's tenth shortest player, standing at 173 cm. In his debut game, Puopolo had a reasonable performance, having nine kicks, six handballs and laying two tackles.

After making his debut in round 7, Puopolo went on to play Hawthorn's remaining 19 games of the 2011 season, including three finals. His goal late in the round 24 final quarter against Gold Coast sealed the match, along with his tackle soon after which thwarted a forward 50 entry - the win secured Hawthorn a top 4 ladder position for the finals ahead. Puopolo kicked 3 goals in the Semi-Final against Sydney, and 1 goal against Collingwood in the Preliminary Final. He finished his debut season with 20 games and 8 goals, gaining much experience in a brilliant first season. He was awarded Hawthorn's Best First Year Player Award.

In the 2012 season, Puopolo played in 21 out of 25 games and kicked 24 goals. He played in Hawthorn's loss to Sydney in the 2012 AFL Grand Final. 

In the 2013 season Puopolo played in 22 out of 25 games and kicked 15 goals. Puopolo achieved his first premiership during that season when Hawthorn defeated Fremantle in the 2013 AFL Grand Final.

In the 2014 season, Puopolo was the recipient of his second premiership, as Hawthorn triumphed over the Sydney Swans in the Grand Final.

Puopolo had what was widely regarded as a good year in 2015, kicking 29 goals and picking up his third premiership as Hawthorn defeated the West Coast Eagles in the Grand Final. He played his 100th game during the 2015 season, in round 15 against Fremantle.

Puopolo had another good season in 2016, kicking a career high 34 goals. At the end of year he re-signed for an extra year with Hawthorn, ensuring he would remain at the club until at least 2018.</ref>

In the middle of the 2017 season, Puopolo suffered a groin injury that limited him to 15 games for the year. Despite this, he was considered to have put in good performances in the games he did play, setting a career-high tackling average. Puopolo suffered a hamstring injury early in the 2018 season that kept him out for over a month, but was still regarded as a high-quality pressure forward and was resigned for another year at the end of the season.

Puopolo managed to play all 22 games in the 2019 season, wherein his performances were marked by a shift away from goalkicking to defensive pressure, kicking a career low 10 goals but laying 99 tackles, a number generally considered impressive.

After struggling for form and falling out of the team, Puopolo announced he would retire from the AFL at the end of 2020.

Statistics

|- style=background:#EAEAEA
| 2011 ||  || 28
| 20 || 8 || 5 || 175 || 172 || 347 || 72 || 68 || 0.4 || 0.3 || 8.8 || 8.6 || 17.4 || 3.6 || 3.4 || 0
|-
| 2012 ||  || 28
| 21 || 24 || 14 || 118 || 105 || 223 || 38 || 64 || 1.1 || 0.7 || 5.6 || 5.0 || 10.6 || 1.8 || 3.0 || 0
|- style=background:#EAEAEA
| bgcolor=F0E68C | 2013# ||  || 28
| 22 || 15 || 6 || 182 || 194 || 376 || 48 || 96 || 0.7 || 0.3 || 8.3 || 8.8 || 17.1 || 2.2 || 4.4 || 0
|-
| bgcolor=F0E68C| 2014# ||  || 28
| 25 || 22 || 16 || 205 || 191 || 396 || 69 || 109 || 0.9 || 0.6 || 8.2 || 7.6 || 15.8 || 2.8 || 4.4 || 0
|- style=background:#EAEAEA
| bgcolor=F0E68C| 2015# ||  || 28
| 23 || 29 || 12 || 151 || 155 || 306 || 47 || 114 || 1.3 || 0.5 || 6.6 || 6.7 || 13.3 || 2.0 || 5.0 || 0
|-
| 2016 ||  || 28
| 22 || 34 || 15 || 154 || 155 || 309 || 48 || 100 || 1.6 || 0.7 || 7.0 || 7.1 || 14.1 || 2.2 || 4.6 || 3
|- style=background:#EAEAEA
| 2017 ||  || 28
| 15 || 19 || 4 || 97 || 92 || 189 || 27 || 87 || 1.3 || 0.3 || 6.5 || 6.1 || 12.6 || 1.8 || 5.8 || 0
|-
| 2018 ||  || 28
| 20 || 20 || 6 || 130 || 118 || 248 || 42 || 84 || 1.0 || 0.3 || 6.5 || 5.9 || 12.4 || 2.1 || 4.2 || 1
|- style=background:#EAEAEA
| 2019 ||  || 28
| 22 || 10 || 10 || 116 || 148 || 264 || 41 || 99 || 0.5 || 0.5 || 5.3 || 6.7 || 12.0 || 1.9 || 4.5 || 0
|-
| 2020 ||  || 28
| 6 || 4 || 1 || 27 || 27 || 54 || 7 || 15 || 0.7 || 0.2 || 4.5 || 4.5 || 9.0 || 1.2 || 2.5 || 0
|- class="sortbottom"
! colspan=3| Career
! 196 !! 185 !! 89 !! 1355 !! 1357 !! 2712 !! 439 !! 836 !! 0.9 !! 0.5 !! 6.9 !! 6.9 !! 13.8 !! 2.2 !! 4.3 !! 4
|}

Notes

Honours and achievements
Team
 3× AFL premiership player: 2013, 2014, 2015
 2× Minor premiership: 2012, 2013

Individual
  best clubman: 2020
  best first year player (debut season): 2011
  life member

References

External links

Paul Puopolo's draft profile on the Official AFL Website of the Hawthorn Football Club

1987 births
Norwood Football Club players
Hawthorn Football Club players
Hawthorn Football Club Premiership players
Living people
Australian rules footballers from South Australia
Australian people of Italian descent
Box Hill Football Club players
Three-time VFL/AFL Premiership players